Steve Piearce (born 27 September 1974) is an English former footballer who played as a striker. He played in the Football League for Doncaster Rovers.

Career
Piearce began his career as a trainee with Wolverhampton Wanderers, but despite signing professional terms with the club never played a first team match for the club.

He moved to Third Division Doncaster Rovers in Summer 1996 on a free transfer, making his senior debut on 17 August 1996 in a 0–1 loss to Carlisle. The striker made nineteen appearances for the club during the 1996–97 season but only scored once before being released.

After his release from Doncaster, Piearce dropped into non-league football, initially with Halesowen Town.

References

External links

The Hereford United Archives

1974 births
Living people
Sportspeople from Sutton Coldfield
English footballers
Wolverhampton Wanderers F.C. players
Doncaster Rovers F.C. players
Hereford United F.C. players
Hednesford Town F.C. players
Halesowen Town F.C. players
English Football League players
Association football forwards